Libby Weaver is an Australian biochemist who is an author, speaker and founder of the food-based supplement range, Bio Blends.

Weaver founded Bio Blends, a nutritional supplement range.

Weaver has spoken on television and radio as an authoritative figure in the health and wellness industry..

Born in Tamworth, New South Wales, she spoke at TedxQueenstown in 2014 on the topic of ‘The pace of modern life versus our cavewoman biochemistry’.

Bibliography

Libby Weaver (2014). The Calorie Fallacy. Little Green Frog Publishing Ltd. 
Libby Weaver (2015). Exhausted to Energised. Little Green Frog Publishing Ltd. 
Libby Weaver (2015). The Energy Guide. Pan Macmillan Australia. 
Libby Weaver (2016). Women's Wellness Wisdom. Little Green Frog Publishing Ltd. 
Libby Weaver (2017). What Am I Supposed to Eat? Little Green Frog Publishing Ltd. 
Libby Weaver (2018). The Beauty Guide. Little Green Frog Publishing Ltd. 
Libby Weaver (2019). The Invisible Load. Little Green Frog Publishing Ltd.

References

Living people
Australian biochemists
Australian women chemists
Australian non-fiction writers
Australian women writers
University of Newcastle (Australia) alumni
Year of birth missing (living people)